Wadley is a town in Randolph County, Alabama, United States. It is home to the Wadley campus of Southern Union State Community College. As of the 2010 census, the population of the town was 751, up from 640 in 2000. According to the 1910 U.S. Census, the town was incorporated in 1908.

Geography
Wadley is located at  (33.123327, −85.566350).

Demographics

As of the census of 2000, there were 640 people, 228 households, and 149 families residing in the town. The racial makeup of the town was 65.16% White, 33.28% Black or African American, 1.09% from other races, and 0.47% from two or more races. 2.19% of the population were Hispanic or Latino of any race.

There were 228 households, out of which 33.3% had children under the age of 18 living with them, 37.3% were married couples living together, 24.1% had a female householder with no husband present, and 34.6% were non-families. 32.5% of all households were made up of individuals, and 14.0% had someone living alone who was 65 years of age or older. The average household size was 2.28 and the average family size was 2.91.

In the town, the population was spread out, with 24.1% under the age of 18, 25.0% from 18 to 24, 23.4% from 25 to 44, 14.5% from 45 to 64, and 13.0% who were 65 years of age or older. The median age was 27 years. For every 100 females, there were 81.8 males. For every 100 females age 18 and over, there were 80.0 males.

The median income for a household in the town was $17,500, and the median income for a family was $24,219. Males had a median income of $26,563 versus $18,750 for females. The per capita income for the town was $9,076. About 29.4% of families and 30.9% of the population were below the poverty line, including 38.6% of those under age 18 and 28.2% of those age 65 or over.

School
Wadley is home to Wadley High School. The local school district has an enrollment of about 400 children in all grades. The school's most notable alumnus is Terrell Zachery, who played on the 2010 Auburn University College Football National Championship team. He has had NFL experience with the Jacksonville Jaguars.

Notable people
Jamie Langley, Miss Alabama 2007
Tom Radney, former American Democratic politician and lawyer
Kayla Braxton, WWE broadcaster

Gallery

Climate
The climate in this area is characterized by hot, humid summers and generally mild to cool winters.  According to the Köppen Climate Classification system, Wadley has a humid subtropical climate, abbreviated "Cfa" on climate maps.

References

Towns in Randolph County, Alabama
Towns in Alabama